Constitutional Assembly elections were held in the Socialist Republic of Montenegro on 3 November 1946. They were the first elections in Montenegro in which women had the right to vote, and three women were elected to the Assembly; Lidija Jovanović, Dobrila Ojdanić and Draginja Vušović.

Background
After Montenegro became part Yugoslavia following World War I, the Montenegrin parliament was abolished. During World War II, a Montenegrin legislature was revived when the State Anti-fascist Council for the National Liberation of Montenegro and Boka was established. This became the Montenegrin Anti-Fascist Assembly of National Liberation (CASNO) in 1944.

On 15 April 1945 the CASNO was renamed the Montenegrin National Assembly, before it became the National Assembly on 15 February 1946.

Aftermath
After adopting the new constitution of the People's Republic of Montenegro, the Assembly was converted into a National Assembly, which served out the parliamentary term until the 1950.

Petar Komnenić was the President of the Assembly until 1949, when he was replaced by Đuro Čagorović.

References

Elections in Montenegro
1946 in Yugoslavia
Montenegro